Alessandro Gravina (born 20 September 1979), also known as Alex Gravina, is a Canadian former professional tennis player active in the 1990s and 2000s.

Gravina was born in Toronto and is of Italian descent. His most notable achievement in professional tennis was winning the doubles title at the Challenger de Granby, a tournament on the ATP Challenger Tour.

ATP Challenger and ITF Futures finals

Doubles: 1 (1–0)

References

External links
 
 

1979 births
Living people
Canadian male tennis players
Canadian people of Italian descent
Tennis players from Toronto